Baffoe is a surname. Notable people with the surname include:

Anthony Baffoe (born 1965), footballer
Felix Baffoe (born 1986), footballer
Frank Baffoe (born 1935), Ghanaian Economist, diplomat and businessman
Kojo Baffoe (born 1972), businessman, entrepreneur, writer, poet, blogger, media consultant (television and print), producer, columnist, editor

Surnames of Akan origin